Wright Tavern, also known as the Reid House and Reid Hotel, is a historic inn and tavern located at Wentworth, Rockingham County, North Carolina. The oldest section was built about 1816, and is a two-story, four bay, building with Federal style interior design elements.  It takes the form of a "dog run" house. It was the birthplace and home of U.S. Congressman James Wesley Reid (1849-1902). It was restored in the early-1970s by the Rockingham County Historical Society.

It was listed on the National Register of Historic Places in 1970.

References

External links
Visit Wright Tavern

Historic American Buildings Survey in North Carolina
Hotel buildings on the National Register of Historic Places in North Carolina
Commercial buildings completed in 1814
Hotels in North Carolina
National Register of Historic Places in Rockingham County, North Carolina
Museums in Rockingham County, North Carolina
Houses in Rockingham County, North Carolina